The Bikwin–Jen or simply the Jen languages form a branch of the Adamawa family. They are spoken in and around 	Karim Lamido LGA (to the north of Jalingo LGA) in Taraba State, and in other nearby states of eastern Nigeria.

Bikwin-Jen may not necessarily be a coherent group. Due to the internal diversity of Bikwin-Jen, Guldemann (2018) suggests that Bikwin and Jen could form separate groups.

Classification
Norton & Othaniel (2020) and Norton (2019) refer to Bikwin–Jen simply as Jen. Kleinewillinghöfer (2015) uses the name Bikwin–Jen.

Kleinewillinghöfer (2015)
Kleinewillinghöfer (2015) classifies the Bikwin-Jen group as follows in the Adamawa Languages Project website.
Bikwin-Jen
Bikwin
Burak-Loo
Burak [ɓʋʋrak]
Loo [shʋŋɔ]
Mak-Tal
Mak (LeeMak)
Panya
Zoo
Maɣdi (Tala)
Bikwin (proper)
Leelau (Munga Leelau)
Mɔɔ (Gomu)
Kya̰k (Bambuka)
Jen (Janjo)
Dza
Dza (local variants)
Joole, Jaule
Munga Doso
Tha [θá]

Norton & Othaniel (2020)
Classification of the Jen languages by Norton & Othaniel (2020):

Language names, ISO codes, and autonyms of the Jen languages (Norton & Othaniel 2020):

Norton & Othaniel (2020) also reconstruct more than 250 words for Proto-Jen.

Norton (2019)
Jen cluster classification according to Norton (2019):
Jen
Burak, Loo
Maghdi, LeeMak
Kyak-Moo-LeeLau (Munga LeeLau)
Tha (Joole Manga)
Doso-Dza (Munga Doso; Dza-Joole)

Language varieties that are part of the Jen cluster according to Norton (2019):
Jen cluster
Burak
Loo of Galdemaru and Waamura
Maghdi (Tala)
Mak (LeeMak) of Panya and Zoo
Kyãk (Bambuka)
Moo (Gomu)
LeeLau (Munga LeeLau)
Munga Doso
Dza (Jenjo) and Joole
Tha (Joole Manga)

Names and locations
Below is a list of language names, populations, and locations from Blench (2019).

See also
Proto-Jen reconstructions (Wiktionary)

References

External links
Bikwin-Jen (Adamawa Languages Project)
Ɓəna-Mboi (Yungur) group (Adamawa Languages Project)
Bena-Yungur (AdaGram)

 
Languages of Nigeria